Frieseomelitta varia, commonly known as the abelha marmelada-amarela (Brazilian Portuguese: "yellow marmalade bee"), is a species of eusocial stingless bee in the family Apidae and tribe Meliponini.

References

Meliponini
Hymenoptera of South America
Hymenoptera of Brazil
Insects described in 1836
Taxa named by Amédée Louis Michel le Peletier